Pipturus albidus, known as māmaki (sometimes waimea, for its resemblance to olomea) in Hawaiian and known as Waimea pipturus in English, is a species of flowering plant in the nettle family, Urticaceae, that is endemic to Hawaii.

Uses

Medicinal
Native Hawaiians made a treatment for illnesses known as ea and pāaoao from the fruit. They also combined fresh māmaki leaves with hot stones and spring water to produce herbal tea that was an effective treatment for general debility. Today, packages of dried māmaki leaves are commercially produced.

Non-medicinal
The bast fibres were used by Native Hawaiians to make kapa (bark cloth) and kaula (rope).

Ecology
P. albidus is the preferred host plant for the caterpillars of the Kamehameha butterfly (Vanessa tameamea). Māmaki sometimes host the caterpillars of the green Hawaiian blue (Udara blackburni).

References

External links

albidus
Trees of Hawaii
Endemic flora of Hawaii
Hawaiian cuisine
Herbal tea
Flora without expected TNC conservation status